"Come Dig Me Out" is a song by British singer-songwriter Kelly Osbourne. It was planned as the third single to be released from Osbourne's debut album Shut Up, however, the release was cancelled when Osbourne’s record label Epic dropped her. Despite this, it was picked as the "Coolest Song of the Week" on 6 June 2004, on the syndicated Little Steven's Underground Garage station. As the song was never released as a single, only promotional copies were made.

Songwriting credits
The song is a cover of singer/songwriter Michelle Lewis' "Dig Me Out", which appeared on her 1998 album Little Leviathan.

Track listing
 "Come Dig Me Out" (Radio cut)
 "Everything's Alright"

2003 songs
Kelly Osbourne songs
Songs written by Michelle Lewis